KAMAZ is a Russian football club based in Naberezhnye Chelny, Russia. The club plays in the second-tier Russian First League.

Colours are (Home) all white. (Away) Light blue shirts, white shorts.

History
The club was founded on 11 November 1981 at the KAMAZ plant under the name Trud-PRZ. The team played in local tournaments until 1988, when they entered Soviet Second League.

KAMAZ stayed in this league until 1992, when following the collapse of the Soviet Union they were entitled to play in the Russian First League. They won the Centre Zone tournament and were promoted into the Top League.

The best result achieved by KAMAZ in the Top League was a 6th position in 1994. It allowed the club to participate in the Intertoto Cup, where KAMAZ reached the semifinals, defeating München 1860 in the group stage.

KAMAZ stayed in the top flight from 1993 to 1997, when the financial troubles of their owner, KAMAZ plant, forced them into the First Division and into the Second Division a year later. The team played in the Ural Zone of the Second Division from 1999 to 2003, where they earned promotion.

KAMAZ became one of the leaders of the First Division in the 2000s, finishing 4th in 2004, 2006, 2007, and 2010 and 3rd in 2005 and 2008. They were relegated back to the third-tier at the end of the 2015–16 season.

On 15 June 2021, the club secured first place in their PFL group and promotion back to FNL.

The club has been known as Trud-PRZ (1981–1987), Torpedo (1988–1989), and KAMAZ-Chally (1995–2000).

The club has won 4 Second Division titles and 1 First Division title.

KAMAZ finished the 2021–22 Russian Football National League in a relegation spot, but was not relegated due to other clubs failing to obtain the 2022–23 season license.

KAMAZ in Europe

UEFA Intertoto Cup 1996

Group 8

Semi-finals (27–28 & 31 July)

FC KAMAZ  2–0, 0–4 En Avant Guingamp

League history

Soviet Union

Russia

Current squad
As of 21 February 2023, according to the First League website.

Out on loan

Reserve squad
KAMAZ's reserve squad played professionally as FC KAMAZ-d Naberezhnye Chelny (Russian Second League in 1993, Russian Third League in 1994) and as FC KAMAZ-Chally-d Naberezhnye Chelny (Russian Third League in 1995–1997).

Notable players
Had international caps for their respective countries. Players whose name is listed in bold represented their countries while playing for KAMAZ.

Soviet Union
  Ivan Yaremchuk
     Akhrik Tsveiba
  Anton Bober
  Soslan Dzhanayev
  Vladislav Ignatyev
  Ruslan Nigmatullin
  Andrei Novosadov
  Yevgeni Varlamov
Armenia
  Barsegh Kirakosyan
Azerbaijan
  Ruslan İdiqov
Belarus
  Alyaksandar Lukhvich
  Yuri Shukanov
Bosnia and Herzegovina 
  Zajko Zeba
Georgia
  Iuri Gabiskiria
  Revaz Gotsiridze
  Mikheil Jishkariani
Kazakhstan
  Oleg Kapustnikov
  Maksim Shevchenko
  Sergei Zhunenko
Lithuania
  Valdemaras Martinkenas
  Aidas Preikšaitis
  Tomas Ražanauskas
  Giedrius Žutautas
Malawi
  Essau Kanyenda
Moldova
  Nicolae Josan
  Alexandru Onica
Jordan
  Badran Al-Shagran
  Adnan Awad

References

External links
Official website 

 
Association football clubs established in 1981
KAMAZ Naberezhnye Chelny
KAMAZ Naberezhnye Chelny
1981 establishments in Russia